"Kiinni jäit" is a song by Finnish pop singer Jontte Valosaari featuring rapper Mikael Gabriel. Released on 21 January 2014, the song peaked at number six on the Finnish Singles Chart.

Chart performance

References

External links
 

2014 singles
Jontte Valosaari songs
2014 songs
EMI Records singles